The 62nd parallel north is a circle of latitude that is 62 degrees north of the Earth's equatorial plane. It crosses the Atlantic Ocean, Europe, Asia and North America.

At this latitude the sun is visible for 19 hours, 45 minutes during the summer solstice and 5 hours, 9 minutes during the winter solstice.

Around the world
Starting at the Prime Meridian and heading eastwards, the parallel 62° north passes through:

{| class="wikitable plainrowheaders"
! scope="col" width="125" | Co-ordinates
! scope="col" | Country, territory or sea
! scope="col" | Notes
|-
| style="background:#b0e0e6;" | 
! scope="row" style="background:#b0e0e6;" | Atlantic Ocean
| style="background:#b0e0e6;" | Norwegian Sea
|-
| 
! scope="row" | 
| Island of Vågsøy, Sogn og Fjordane
|-
| style="background:#b0e0e6;" | 
! scope="row" style="background:#b0e0e6;" | Atlantic Ocean
| style="background:#b0e0e6;" | Sildegapet, Norwegian Sea
|-
| 
! scope="row" | 
| Island of Barmøya, Sogn og Fjordane
|-
| style="background:#b0e0e6;" | 
! scope="row" style="background:#b0e0e6;" | Atlantic Ocean
| style="background:#b0e0e6;" | Barmsundet, Norwegian Sea
|-
| 
! scope="row" | 
| Mainland Sogn og Fjordane, Møre og Romsdal, Oppland, Hedmark
|-
| 
! scope="row" | 
|
|-
| style="background:#b0e0e6;" | 
! scope="row" style="background:#b0e0e6;" | Atlantic Ocean
| style="background:#b0e0e6;" | Gulf of Bothnia, Baltic Sea
|-
| 
! scope="row" | 
|
|-
| 
! scope="row" | 
| Passing through Lake Onega
|-
| style="background:#b0e0e6;" | 
! scope="row" style="background:#b0e0e6;" | Pacific Ocean
| style="background:#b0e0e6;" | Penzhin Bay, Sea of Okhotsk
|-
| 
! scope="row" | 
|
|-
| style="background:#b0e0e6;" | 
! scope="row" style="background:#b0e0e6;" | Pacific Ocean
| style="background:#b0e0e6;" | Bering Sea
|-
| 
! scope="row" | 
| Alaska 
|-valign="top"
| 
! scope="row" | 
| Yukon Northwest Territories - passing through the Great Slave Lake Nunavut
|-
| style="background:#b0e0e6;" | 
! scope="row" style="background:#b0e0e6;" | Arctic Ocean
| style="background:#b0e0e6;" | Hudson BayPassing just south of Coats Island, Nunavut, 
|-
| 
! scope="row" | 
| Nunavut - Mansel Island
|-
| style="background:#b0e0e6;" | 
! scope="row" style="background:#b0e0e6;" | Arctic Ocean
| style="background:#b0e0e6;" | Hudson Bay
|-
| 
! scope="row" | 
| Quebec - Ungava Peninsula
|-
| style="background:#b0e0e6;" | 
! scope="row" style="background:#b0e0e6;" | Arctic Ocean
| style="background:#b0e0e6;" | Hudson Strait
|-
| 
! scope="row" | 
| Nunavut - Smooth Island
|-
| style="background:#b0e0e6;" | 
! scope="row" style="background:#b0e0e6;" | Arctic Ocean
| style="background:#b0e0e6;" | Hudson Strait
|-
| 
! scope="row" | 
| Nunavut - Baffin Island
|-
| style="background:#b0e0e6;" | 
! scope="row" style="background:#b0e0e6;" | Arctic Ocean
| style="background:#b0e0e6;" | Davis StraitPassing just north of Edgell Island, Nunavut, 
|-
| 
! scope="row" | 
|
|-
| style="background:#b0e0e6;" | 
! scope="row" style="background:#b0e0e6;" | Atlantic Ocean
| style="background:#b0e0e6;" |
|-
| 
! scope="row" | 
| Islands of Koltur, Streymoy and Nólsoy
|-
| style="background:#b0e0e6;" | 
! scope="row" style="background:#b0e0e6;" | Atlantic Ocean
| style="background:#b0e0e6;" | Norwegian Sea
|}

See also
61st parallel north
63rd parallel north

References

n62